The Central District of Talesh County is a district (bakhsh) in Talesh County, Gilan Province, Iran. At the 2006 census, its population was 85,258, in 20,617 families.  The District has one city: Hashtpar. The District has three rural districts (dehestan): Kuhestani-ye Talesh Rural District, Saheli-ye Jokandan Rural District, and Tula Rud Rural District.

References 

Talesh County
Districts of Gilan Province